Aerotropolis Atlanta is a planned mixed-use development in Hapeville, Georgia on the site of the former Ford Atlanta Assembly Plant. The site is directly adjacent to Hartsfield-Jackson Atlanta International Airport. The complex is to house offices, retail, and entertainment.

The plant was purchased for over $40 million by Jacoby Development, Inc., in June 2008.  Demolition of the plant began in August 2008 and was expected to take one year. 

In May 2011 Porsche North America announced plans to spend $80-100 million to move their North American headquarters from Sandy Springs to Aerotropolis Atlanta, including a new office building and test track. Porsche will receive about $15 million in economic incentives to do so including a $10 million tax break as Aerotropolis is in an "enterprise zone".  In August 2012, Porsche building permit filings with the City of Atlanta revealed more details of the project's ambitious scope and cost.

References

External links
 "Aerotropolis", The Jacoby Group

Hapeville, Georgia
Buildings and structures in Fulton County, Georgia